= Our Lohja =

Our Lohja (in Finnish: Meidän Lohja) is a local political party in the municipality of Lohja, Finland. In the 2004 municipal elections the party got 1204 votes (7.6%). It got four seats in the municipal council, Pekka Ilmarinen (258 personal preference votes), Saija Leikola (139 votes), Teuvo Laine (129 votes) and Pertti Märila (128 votes).
